In biology, the BBCH-scale for coffee describes the phenological development of bean plants using the BBCH-scale.

The phenological growth stages and BBCH-identification keys of coffee plants are:

References
 

BBCH-scale
Coffee chemistry